Jana Labáthová (born 27 September 1988) is a Slovak synchronized swimmer. She competed in the women's duet at the 2016 Summer Olympics.

References

1988 births
Living people
Slovak synchronized swimmers
Olympic synchronized swimmers of Slovakia
Synchronized swimmers at the 2016 Summer Olympics
Place of birth missing (living people)